In the 2007-08 Maine Black Bears women's ice hockey season, the Black Bears had 4 wins, 27 losses and 3 ties. The team’s Hockey East record was 3 wins, 15 losses, and 3 ties.

Regular season

Schedule

References

Maine Black Bears women's ice hockey seasons
2007–08 NCAA Division I women's hockey season
Black
Black